This is a list of the mammal species recorded in Somaliland. There are 192 identified mammal species or subspecies in Somaliland, of which two are critically endangered, one is endangered, twelve are vulnerable, and four are near threatened.

The following tags are used to highlight each species' conservation status as assessed by the International Union for Conservation of Nature:

Order: Afrosoricida (tenrecs and golden moles) 

The order Afrosoricida contains the golden moles of southern Africa and the tenrecs of Madagascar and Africa, two families of small mammals that were traditionally part of the order Insectivora.
 Family: Chrysochloridae
 Subfamily: Amblysominae
 Genus: Calcochloris
 Somali golden mole, Calcochloris tytonis DD

Order: Macroscelidea (elephant shrews) 

Often called sengis, the elephant shrews or jumping shrews are native to southern Africa. Their common English name derives from their elongated flexible snout and their resemblance to the true shrews.
 Family: Macroscelididae (elephant-shrews)
 Genus: Elephantulus
 Somali elephant shrew, Elephantulus revoili DD
 Rufous elephant shrew, Elephantulus rufescens LC

Order: Tubulidentata (aardvarks) 

The order Tubulidentata consists of a single species, the aardvark. Tubulidentata are characterised by their teeth which lack a pulp cavity and form thin tubes which are continuously worn down and replaced.
 Family: Orycteropodidae
 Genus: Orycteropus
 Aardvark, Orycteropus afer LC

Order: Hyracoidea (hyraxes) 

The hyraxes are any of four species of fairly small, thickset, herbivorous mammals in the order Hyracoidea. About the size of a domestic cat they are well-furred, with rounded bodies and a stumpy tail. They are native to Africa and the Middle East.
 Family: Procaviidae (hyraxes)
 Genus: Heterohyrax
 Yellow-spotted rock hyrax, Heterohyrax brucei LC
 Genus: Procavia
 Cape hyrax, Procavia capensis LC

Order: Proboscidea (elephants) 

The elephants comprise three living species and are the largest living land animals.
 Family: Elephantidae (elephants)
 Genus: Loxodonta
 African bush elephant, Loxodonta africana EN

Order: Sirenia (manatees and dugongs) 

Sirenia is an order of fully aquatic, herbivorous mammals that inhabit rivers, estuaries, coastal marine waters, swamps, and marine wetlands. All four species are endangered.
 Family: Dugongidae
 Genus: Dugong
 Dugong, Dugong dugon VU

Order: Primates 

The order Primates contains humans and their closest relatives: lemurs, lorisoids, tarsiers, monkeys, and apes.
 Suborder: Strepsirrhini
 Infraorder: Lemuriformes
 Superfamily: Lorisoidea
 Family: Galagidae
 Genus: Galago
 Somali bushbaby, Galago gallarum LR/nt
 Genus: Galagoides
 Zanzibar bushbaby, Galagoides zanzibaricus LR/nt
 Genus: Otolemur
 Northern greater galago, Otolemur garnettii LR/lc
 Suborder: Haplorhini
 Infraorder: Simiiformes
 Parvorder: Catarrhini
 Superfamily: Cercopithecoidea
 Family: Cercopithecidae (Old World monkeys)
 Genus: Erythrocebus
 Patas monkey, Erythrocebus patas LR/lc
 Genus: Chlorocebus
 Vervet monkey, Chlorocebus pygerythrus LR/lc
 Genus: Cercopithecus
 Blue monkey, Cercopithecus mitis LR/lc
 Genus: Papio
 Olive baboon, Papio anubis LR/lc
 Yellow baboon, Papio cynocephalus LR/lc
 Hamadryas baboon, Papio hamadryas LR/nt

Order: Rodentia (rodents) 

Rodents make up the largest order of mammals, with over 40% of mammalian species. They have two incisors in the upper and lower jaw which grow continually and must be kept short by gnawing.
 Suborder: Hystricognathi
 Family: Bathyergidae
 Genus: Heterocephalus
 Naked mole-rat, Heterocephalus glaber LC
 Family: Hystricidae (Old World porcupines)
 Genus: Hystrix
 Crested porcupine, Hystrix cristata LC
 Suborder: Sciurognathi
 Family: Sciuridae (squirrels)
 Subfamily: Xerinae
 Tribe: Xerini
 Genus: Xerus
 Unstriped ground squirrel, Xerus rutilus LC
 Tribe: Protoxerini
 Genus: Paraxerus
 Ochre bush squirrel, Paraxerus ochraceus LC
 Red bush squirrel, Paraxerus palliatus LC
 Family: Dipodidae (jerboas)
 Subfamily: Dipodinae
 Genus: Jaculus
 Lesser Egyptian jerboa, Jaculus jaculus LC
 Family: Spalacidae
 Subfamily: Tachyoryctinae
 Genus: Tachyoryctes
 Northeast African mole-rat, Tachyoryctes splendens LC
 Family: Nesomyidae
 Subfamily: Cricetomyinae
 Genus: Saccostomus
 Mearns's pouched mouse, Saccostomus mearnsi LC
 Family: Cricetidae
 Subfamily: Lophiomyinae
 Genus: Lophiomys
 Maned rat, Lophiomys imhausi LC
 Family: Muridae (mice, rats, voles, gerbils, hamsters, etc.)
 Subfamily: Deomyinae
 Genus: Acomys
 Fiery spiny mouse, Acomys ignitus LC
 Kemp's spiny mouse, Acomys kempi LC
 Louise's spiny mouse, Acomys louisae LC
 Mullah spiny mouse, Acomys mullah LC
 Percival's spiny mouse, Acomys percivali LC
 Wilson's spiny mouse, Acomys wilsoni LC
 Subfamily: Gerbillinae
 Genus: Ammodillus
 Ammodile, Ammodillus imbellis DD
 Genus: Gerbillus
 Berbera gerbil, Gerbillus acticola DD
 Brockman's gerbil, Gerbillus brockmani DD
 Somalia gerbil, Gerbillus dunni DD
 Waters's gerbil, Gerbillus juliani LC
 Rosalinda gerbil, Gerbillus rosalinda DD
 Least gerbil, Gerbillus ruberrimus LC
 Somalian gerbil, Gerbillus somalicus DD
 Genus: Microdillus
 Somali pygmy gerbil, Microdillus peeli LC
 Genus: Tatera
 Black-tailed gerbil, Tatera nigricauda LC
 Phillips's gerbil, Tatera phillipsi LC
 Fringe-tailed gerbil, Tatera robusta LC
 Genus: Taterillus
 Harrington's gerbil, Taterillus harringtoni LC
 Subfamily: Murinae
 Genus: Arvicanthis
 Neumann's grass rat, Arvicanthis neumanni DD
 Genus: Grammomys
 Gray-headed thicket rat, Grammomys caniceps DD
 Genus: Mastomys
 Natal multimammate mouse, Mastomys natalensis LC
 Genus: Mus
 Delicate mouse, Mus tenellus LC
 Genus: Myomyscus
 Brockman's Myomyscus, Myomyscus brockmani LC
 Genus: Thallomys
 Acacia rat, Thallomys paedulcus LC
 Family: Ctenodactylidae
 Genus: Pectinator
 Speke's pectinator, Pectinator spekei DD

Order: Lagomorpha (lagomorphs) 

The lagomorphs comprise two families, Leporidae (hares and rabbits), and Ochotonidae (pikas). Though they can resemble rodents, and were classified as a superfamily in that order until the early 20th century, they have since been considered a separate order. They differ from rodents in a number of physical characteristics, such as having four incisors in the upper jaw rather than two.
 Family: Leporidae (rabbits, hares)
 Genus: Lepus
 Cape hare, Lepus capensis LR/lc
 Abyssinian hare, Lepus habessinicus LR/lc

Order: Erinaceomorpha (hedgehogs and gymnures) 

The order Erinaceomorpha contains a single family, Erinaceidae, which comprise the hedgehogs and gymnures. The hedgehogs are easily recognised by their spines while gymnures look more like large rats.
 Family: Erinaceidae (hedgehogs)
 Subfamily: Erinaceinae
 Genus: Atelerix
 Four-toed hedgehog, Atelerix albiventris LR/lc
 Somali hedgehog, Atelerix sclateri LR/lc
 Genus: Hemiechinus
 Desert hedgehog, Hemiechinus aethiopicus LR/lc

Order: Soricomorpha (shrews, moles, and solenodons) 

The "shrew-forms" are insectivorous mammals. The shrews and solenodons closely resemble mice while the moles are stout-bodied burrowers.
 Family: Soricidae (shrews)
 Subfamily: Crocidurinae
 Genus: Crocidura
 Greenwood's shrew, Crocidura greenwoodi LC
 MacArthur's shrew, Crocidura macarthuri LC
 Somali dwarf shrew, Crocidura nana DD
 Desert musk shrew, Crocidura smithii LC
 Somali shrew, Crocidura somalica LC
 Savanna path shrew, Crocidura viaria LC
 Voi shrew, Crocidura voi LC
 Yankari shrew, Crocidura yankariensis LC

Order: Chiroptera (bats) 

The bats' most distinguishing feature is that their forelimbs are developed as wings, making them the only mammals capable of flight. Bat species account for about 20% of all mammals.
 Family: Pteropodidae (flying foxes, Old World fruit bats)
 Subfamily: Pteropodinae
 Genus: Eidolon
 Straw-coloured fruit bat, Eidolon helvum LC
 Genus: Epomophorus
 East African epauletted fruit bat, Epomophorus minimus LC
 Wahlberg's epauletted fruit bat, Epomophorus wahlbergi LC
 Family: Vespertilionidae
 Subfamily: Vespertilioninae
 Genus: Eptesicus
 Botta's serotine, Eptesicus bottae LC
 Genus: Glauconycteris
 Butterfly bat, Glauconycteris variegata LC
 Genus: Hypsugo
 Eisentraut's pipistrelle, Hypsugo eisentrauti DD
 Genus: Neoromicia
 Cape serotine, Neoromicia capensis LC
 Heller's pipistrelle, Neoromicia helios DD
 Banana pipistrelle, Neoromicia nanus LC
 Rendall's serotine, Neoromicia rendalli LC
 Somali serotine, Neoromicia somalicus LC
 Genus: Nycticeinops
 Schlieffen's bat, Nycticeinops schlieffeni LC
 Genus: Pipistrellus
 Egyptian pipistrelle, Pipistrellus deserti LC
 Kuhl's pipistrelle, Pipistrellus kuhlii LC
 Genus: Scotoecus
 White-bellied lesser house bat, Scotoecus albigula DD
 Hinde's lesser house bat, Scotoecus hindei DD
 Dark-winged lesser house bat, Scotoecus hirundo DD
 Genus: Scotophilus
 African yellow bat, Scotophilus dinganii LC
 Family: Rhinopomatidae
 Genus: Rhinopoma
 Lesser mouse-tailed bat, Rhinopoma hardwickei LC
 Macinnes's mouse-tailed bat, Rhinopoma macinnesi VU
 Family: Molossidae
 Genus: Chaerephon
 Little free-tailed bat, Chaerephon pumila LC
 Genus: Mops
 Angolan free-tailed bat, Mops condylurus LC
 Family: Emballonuridae
 Genus: Coleura
 African sheath-tailed bat, Coleura afra LC
 Genus: Taphozous
 Hamilton's tomb bat, Taphozous hamiltoni NT
 Mauritian tomb bat, Taphozous mauritianus LC
 Naked-rumped tomb bat, Taphozous nudiventris LC
 Egyptian tomb bat, Taphozous perforatus LC
 Family: Nycteridae
 Genus: Nycteris
 Andersen's slit-faced bat, Nycteris aurita DD
 Hairy slit-faced bat, Nycteris hispida LC
 Parissi's slit-faced bat, Nycteris parisii DD
 Egyptian slit-faced bat, Nycteris thebaica LC
 Family: Megadermatidae
 Genus: Cardioderma
 Heart-nosed bat, Cardioderma cor LC
 Genus: Lavia
 Yellow-winged bat, Lavia frons LC
 Family: Rhinolophidae
 Subfamily: Rhinolophinae
 Genus: Rhinolophus
 Blasius's horseshoe bat, Rhinolophus blasii NT
 Geoffroy's horseshoe bat, Rhinolophus clivosus LC
 Eloquent horseshoe bat, Rhinolophus eloquens DD
 Rüppell's horseshoe bat, Rhinolophus fumigatus LC
 Hildebrandt's horseshoe bat, Rhinolophus hildebrandti LC
 Lander's horseshoe bat, Rhinolophus landeri LC
 Subfamily: Hipposiderinae
 Genus: Asellia
 Trident leaf-nosed bat, Asellia tridens LC
 Genus: Hipposideros
 Sundevall's roundleaf bat, Hipposideros caffer LC
 Commerson's roundleaf bat, Hipposideros marungensis NT
 Ethiopian large-eared roundleaf bat, Hipposideros megalotis NT
 Genus: Triaenops
 Persian trident bat, Triaenops persicus LC

Order: Pholidota (pangolins) 

The order Pholidota comprises the eight species of pangolin. Pangolins are anteaters and have the powerful claws, elongated snout and long tongue seen in the other unrelated anteater species.
 Family: Manidae
 Genus: Manis
 Ground pangolin, Manis temminckii LR/nt

Order: Cetacea (whales) 

The order Cetacea includes whales, dolphins and porpoises. They are the mammals most fully adapted to aquatic life with a spindle-shaped nearly hairless body, protected by a thick layer of blubber, and forelimbs and tail modified to provide propulsion underwater.
 Suborder: Mysticeti (baleen whales)
 Family: Balaenopteridae (rorquals)
 Subfamily: Balaenopterinae
 Genus: Balaenoptera
 Common minke whale, Balaenoptera acutorostrata LC
 Sei whale, Balaenoptera borealis EN
 Bryde's whale, Balaenoptera edeni DD
 Blue whale, Balaenoptera musculus EN
 Fin whale, Balaenoptera physalus EN
 Subfamily: Megapterinae
 Genus: Megaptera
 Humpback whale, Megaptera novaeangliae CR (Arabian Sea population)
 Suborder: Odontoceti (toothed whales)
 Superfamily: Platanistoidea
 Family: Physeteridae (sperm whales)
 Genus: Physeter
 Sperm whale, Physeter macrocephalus VU
 Family: Kogiidae
 Genus: Kogia
 Pygmy sperm whale, Kogia breviceps LR/lc
 Dwarf sperm whale, Kogia sima LR/lc
 Family: Ziphidae (beaked whales)
 Subfamily: Hyperoodontinae
 Genus: Indopacetus
 Longman's beaked whale, Indopacetus pacificus DD
 Genus: Ziphius
 Cuvier's beaked whale, Ziphius cavirostris DD
 Genus: Mesoplodon
 Blainville's beaked whale, Mesoplodon densirostris DD
 Ginkgo-toothed beaked whale, Mesoplodon ginkgodens DD
 Family: Delphinidae (marine dolphins)
 Genus: Steno
 Rough-toothed dolphin, Steno bredanensis DD
 Genus: Sousa
 Indian humpback dolphin, Sousa plumbea DD
 Genus: Tursiops
 Indo-Pacific bottlenose dolphin, Tursiops aduncus DD
 Common bottlenose dolphin, Tursiops truncatus DD
 Genus: Stenella
 Pantropical spotted dolphin, Stenella attenuata LR/cd
 Striped dolphin, Stenella coeruleoalba LR/cd
 Spinner dolphin, Stenella longirostris LR/cd
 Genus: Lagenodelphis
 Fraser's dolphin, Lagenodelphis hosei DD
 Genus: Grampus
 Risso's dolphin, Grampus griseus DD
 Genus: Feresa
 Pygmy killer whale, Feresa attenuata DD
 Genus: Pseudorca
 False killer whale, Pseudorca crassidens LR/lc
 Genus: Orcinus
 Orca, Orcinus orca LR/cd
 Genus: Globicephala
 Short-finned pilot whale, Globicephala macrorhynchus LR/cd
 Genus: Peponocephala
 Melon-headed whale, Peponocephala electra DD

Order: Carnivora (carnivorans) 

There are over 260 species of carnivorans, the majority of which feed primarily on meat. They have a characteristic skull shape and dentition.
 Suborder: Feliformia
 Family: Felidae
 Subfamily: Felinae
 Genus: Acinonyx
 Cheetah, Acinonyx jubatus VU
 Genus: Caracal
 Caracal, Caracal caracal LC
 Genus: Felis
 African wildcat, Felis lybica LC
 Genus: Leptailurus
 Serval, Leptailurus serval LC
 Subfamily: Pantherinae
 Genus: Panthera
 Lion, Panthera leo VU
 Leopard, Panthera pardus VU
 Family: Viverridae
 Subfamily: Viverrinae
 Genus: Civettictis
 African civet, Civettictis civetta LC
 Genus: Genetta
 Abyssinian genet, Genetta abyssinica DD
 Common genet, Genetta genetta LC
 Family: Herpestidae (mongooses)
 Genus: Atilax
 Marsh mongoose, Atilax paludinosus LC
 Genus: Galerella
 Slender mongoose, Galerella sanguinea LC
 Genus: Helogale
 Ethiopian dwarf mongoose, Helogale hirtula LC
 Common dwarf mongoose, Helogale parvula LC
 Genus: Ichneumia
 White-tailed mongoose, Ichneumia albicauda LC
 Genus: Mungos
 Banded mongoose, Mungos mungo LC
 Family: Hyaenidae (hyaenas)
 Genus: Crocuta
 Spotted hyena, Crocuta crocuta LC
 Genus: Hyaena
 Striped hyena, Hyaena hyaena NT
 Genus: Proteles
 Aardwolf, Proteles cristatus LC
 Suborder: Caniformia
 Family: Canidae (dogs, foxes)
 Genus: Vulpes
 Rüppell's fox, Vulpes rueppelli
 Genus: Canis
 Side-striped jackal, Canis adustus LC
 African golden wolf, Canis anthus NE
 Black-backed jackal, Canis mesomelas LC
 Genus: Otocyon
 Bat-eared fox, Otocyon megalotis LC
 Genus: Lycaon
 African wild dog, Lycaon pictus EN
 Family: Mustelidae (mustelids)
 Genus: Ictonyx
 Striped polecat, Ictonyx striatus LC
 Genus: Mellivora
Honey badger, M. capensis

Order: Perissodactyla (odd-toed ungulates) 

The odd-toed ungulates are browsing and grazing mammals. They are usually large to very large, and have relatively simple stomachs and a large middle toe.
 Family: Equidae (horses etc.)
 Genus: Equus
 Somali wild ass, Equus africanus somaliensis CR
 Grant's zebra, Equus quagga boehmi NT

Order: Artiodactyla (even-toed ungulates) 

The even-toed ungulates are ungulates whose weight is borne about equally by the third and fourth toes, rather than mostly or entirely by the third as in perissodactyls. There are about 220 artiodactyl species, including many that are of great economic importance to humans.
 Family: Suidae (pigs)
 Subfamily: Phacochoerinae
 Genus: Phacochoerus
 Desert warthog, Phacochoerus aethiopicus LR/lc
 Common warthog, Phacochoerus africanus LR/lc
 Subfamily: Suinae
 Genus: Potamochoerus
 Bushpig, Potamochoerus larvatus LR/lc
 Family: Hippopotamidae (hippopotamuses)
 Genus: Hippopotamus
 Hippopotamus, Hippopotamus amphibius VU
 Family: Giraffidae (giraffe, okapi)
 Genus: Giraffa
 Reticulated giraffe, Giraffa reticulata VU
 Family: Bovidae (cattle, antelope, sheep, goats)
 Genus: Damaliscus
 Topi, Damaliscus lunatus LR/cd
 Genus: Beatragus
 Hirola, Beatragus hunteri CR
 Subfamily: Antilopinae
 Genus: Ammodorcas
 Dibatag, Ammodorcas clarkei VU
 Genus: Dorcatragus
 Beira, Dorcatragus megalotis VU
 Genus: Gazella
 Dorcas gazelle, Gazella dorcas VU
 Grant's gazelle, Gazella granti LR/cd
 Soemmerring's gazelle, Gazella soemmerringii VU
 Speke's gazelle, Gazella spekei VU
 Genus: Litocranius
 Gerenuk, Litocranius walleri LR/cd
 Genus: Madoqua
 Kirk's dik-dik, Madoqua kirkii LR/lc
 Silver dik-dik, Madoqua piacentinii VU
 Salt's dik-dik, Madoqua saltiana LR/lc
 Genus: Oreotragus
 Klipspringer, Oreotragus oreotragus LR/cd
 Genus: Ourebia
 Oribi, Ourebia ourebi LR/cd
 Subfamily: Bovinae
 Genus: Syncerus
 African buffalo, Syncerus caffer LR/cd
 Genus: Tragelaphus
 Lesser kudu, Tragelaphus imberbis LR/cd
 Bushbuck, Tragelaphus scriptus LR/lc
 Greater kudu, Tragelaphus strepsiceros LR/cd
 Subfamily: Cephalophinae
 Genus: Cephalophus
 Harvey's duiker, Cephalophus harveyi LR/cd
 Genus: Sylvicapra
 Common duiker, Sylvicapra grimmia LR/lc
 Subfamily: Hippotraginae
 Genus: Oryx
 East African oryx, Oryx beisa LR/cd
 Subfamily: Reduncinae
 Genus: Kobus
 Waterbuck, Kobus ellipsiprymnus LR/cd
 Family: Camelidae
 Genus: Camelus
 Dromedary, Camelus dromedarius LC

See also
 Wildlife of Somaliland
 List of chordate orders
 Lists of mammals by region
 List of prehistoric mammals
 Mammal classification
 List of mammals described in the 2000s

Notes

References
  
 
 

Somaliland
Somaliland
Mammals